This is a list of protected areas of Prince Edward Island.

National Parks and National Historic Sites
 Prince Edward Island National Park
 Skmaqn–Port-la-Joye–Fort Amherst
 Province House
 Ardgowan

Provincial Parks

Kings County

Prince County

Queens County

Municipal Parks

Charlottetown
 Confederation Landing Park
 Connaught Square
 Hillsborough Square
 Kings Square
 Rochford Square
 Queen Elizabeth Park
 Victoria Park

Summerside
 Rotary Park
 Queen Elizabeth Park

See also
List of Canadian protected areas

External links
Parks Canada Directory - Provincial Parks of Prince Edward Island
Government of Prince Edward Island - Provincial Parks

Prince
Protected areas